Santa Isabel Creek is a small stream of water located in Webb County, Texas which runs through Laredo, Texas. The creek is formed 32 miles from Callaghan, Texas and runs southwest for  until the creek connects to the Rio Grande. The terrain surrounding the creek is mostly clay. The vegetation surrounding the creek is mostly made up of mesquite, cacti, and grasses. Santa Isabel Creek crosses Three major highways in Laredo, Texas among them are: Farm to Market Road 1472, Texas State Highway 255, and United States Route 83.

Coordinates
 Source:  Webb County, Texas
 Mouth:  Rio Grande at Laredo, Texas

See also
 List of rivers of Texas
 List of tributaries of the Rio Grande

References

Tributaries of the Rio Grande
Geography of Laredo, Texas
Rivers of Texas